Gods Lake is a lake in northeastern Manitoba in Canada. It drains north via the Gods River and the Hayes River to Hudson Bay.

The area was featured in season 7 of the reality television series Ice Road Truckers. Richard Wagamese writes about Gods Lake in chapter 5 of Indian Horse.

Settlements 

The First Nations communities of Gods Lake Narrows, Gods Lake (God's Lake 23), and Gods River are located on the shores of the lake.

Gods Lake Narrows is in the southern portion of Gods Lake where the lake narrows. The community is built on an island in the narrows of the lake and on the west and east shores. Gods Lake Narrows consists of the northern community of Gods Lake Narrows (a designated place in the 2011 Canada Census) with a population of 85 and God's Lake 23, a God's Lake First Nation community of 1,341 people.

At the mouth of Gods River on the northern end of the lake is the primary settlement of the Manto Sipi First Nation community of Gods River (God's River 86A) with 596 people.

See also
List of lakes of Manitoba
Animism: The God's Lake, a Canadian TV series
Indian_Horse_(film)

References

Lakes of Manitoba
Hudson's Bay Company trading posts